Sirna may refer to: 
 
Sírna, legendary High King of Ireland
Șirna, a commune in Prahova County, Romania
Sirna, Iran, a village in Markazi Province, Iran
Small interfering RNA (siRNA)
Syrna, also spelled Sirna, Greek village
Syrna (island), also spelled Sirna, Greek island
Sirna Therapeutics